Hervé Laurent is a French sailor born on 2 May 1957 in Lorient, (Morbihan). He competed in the Vendee Globe round the yacht race twice in 1996 and 2004.

Career highlights

References

External links
 Official Facebook Page
 Official Webpage

1957 births
Living people
French male sailors (sport)
Sportspeople from Lorient
IMOCA 60 class sailors
French Vendee Globe sailors
1996 Vendee Globe sailors
2004 Vendee Globe sailors
Vendée Globe finishers
Single-handed circumnavigating sailors